is a Japanese photographer who has concentrated on people in cities as subjects.

Life and career
Kodama was born in Wakayama City (Wakayama Prefecture, Japan) in 1945. She graduated from Kuwasawa Design School in 1967. She then worked as a photographer for a company named Le Mars.

In 1990 Grafication, a PR magazine of Fuji Xerox, published a series of pieces by Kodama that were later collected into her first photobook, Criteria. With its depiction of nuclear power plants and other scenes of advanced technology, this book was widely noted as a remarkable document.

This was followed by depictions of street life in the metropolis, in the photobook Tokyo Kinetic and various exhibitions. In 1993, Kodama won the Annual Award of the Photographic Society of Japan. From April 1993 to March 1995, the magazine Asahi Camera ran a series by her, Tokyo Cruising.

Exhibitions

Solo exhibitions
Kuraiteria / Criteria.
Tōkyō Kinetikku. Ginza Nikon Salon, 1992.
Tokyo Photographs
Hanazakari no koro: Machi no hitobito
Tōkyō kōgai. Gallery Art Graph, 1997.
Kibō no genzai ). Osaka Nikon Salon, July 2007.

Group exhibitions
11-nin no Itaria, Nihon no shashinka-ten. Istituto Italiano di Cultura di Tokyo.
About Big Cities. Neue Gesellschaft für Bildende Kunst (Berlin), 1993.
Josei-shashinka no manazashi, 1945–1997. Tokyo Metropolitan Museum of Photography, 1998.

Collections
The Tokyo Metropolitan Museum of Photography possesses twenty prints by Kodama of Tokyo and Tokyo Bay, dating from 1970 to 1977.

Books by Kodama
Kuraiteria: Kodama Fusako shashinshū / Criteria. Tokyo: IPC, 1990. . Color photographs, captions and text in both Japanese and English. Japan as a high-tech society. (Eleven of the photographs are of the Fukushima No. 2 nuclear power plant.)
Sennen-go niwa: Tōkyō: Kodama Fusako shashinshū / Tokyo Kinetic. Tokyo: Gendai Shokan, 1992. . Black and white views of Tokyo; text in Japanese only.

Video
Together with Miho Akioka, Miyako Ishiuchi, Yuri Nagahara, Hiroko Matsuo and Michiko Matsumoto, Kodama is interviewed within the video 6 works and 6 artists.

References

Japanese photographers
People from Wakayama (city)
1945 births
Living people
Japanese women photographers